Time and the River is the fourth released novel by author Zee Edgell, published in 2007 in Heinemann's Caribbean Writers Series. Edgell announced the arrival of the book in January and appeared in Belize in March at the University of Belize in Belmopan and in Belize City promoting the book.

Plot summary 
Main character Leah Lawson, 18, is a slave in mid to late 19th century Belize (the colony of British Honduras not having been formed until 1862). The story traces her rise in stature to slaveowner, continuing the tradition of female protagonists in Edgell works.

Reception
Early reviews from Andrew Steinhauer of The Belize Times noted that the characters and discussion prevalent in all Edgell novels are "industrial grade" here, and expressed problems with the cover.

References

External links
 "Zee Edgell reads from 'Time and the River'"
 "Author Zee Edgell re-launches 'Time and the River'"

2007 American novels
Novels by Zee Edgell
Belizean novels
Novels about slavery
Historical novels
Novels set in Belize
Heinemann (publisher) books